Club de Deportes Naval is a Chilean football club, their home town is Talcahuano, Biobío Region. They currently play at the fifth level of Chilean football, Tercera B of Chile.

The club were founded  on August 27, 1972 as Club de Deportes Los Náuticos. In 1992 the club were called Deportes Talcahuano, and since 2004, Club de Deportes Naval.
Their home games are played at the Estadio El Morro, which currently has a capacity of 5,000 seats.

Titles
Tercera División: 2
1999, 2008

Current squad

See also
Chilean football league system
Naval de Talcahuano

External links
 Official Club Website 

Naval
Association football clubs established in 1972
1972 establishments in Chile
Naval